Inukai (written: 犬養 or 犬飼) is a Japanese surname. Notable people with the surname include:

, Japanese actor
, Japanese politician and Prime Minister of Japan
Kyohei Inukai (born 1886), Japanese-American painter
Kyohei Inukai (born 1913), Japanese-American artist
, Japanese writer and philanthropist 
, Japanese footballer
, Japanese literature academic
, Japanese politician and writer
, Japanese footballer

Fictional characters 

 , a character from the manga series Science Fell In Love, So I Tried to Prove It
 , a character from the web manga series My Life as Inukai-san's Dog

See also
Inukai, Ōita, a former town in Ōno District, Ōita, Japan
Inukai Station, a railway station in Ōita Prefecture

Japanese-language surnames